Sebastian Uvira (born 26 January 1993 in Freiburg) is a German professional ice hockey Winger. He currently plays for Schwenninger Wild Wings in the Deutsche Eishockey Liga (DEL).

Playing career
During the 2014–15 season, Uvira was traded from Augsburger Panther to Kölner Haie on 26 November 2014.  He represented Germany at the 2018 IIHF World Championship.

After eight seasons with Kölner Haie, Uvira left as a free agent and was signed to a three-year contract in joining his third DEL club, Schwenninger Wild Wings, on 18 July 2022.

Personal life
His father is Eduard Uvíra, a former ice hockey player for the Czechoslovakia men's national ice hockey team which won a silver medal at the 1984 Winter Olympics.

Career statistics

Regular season and playoffs

International

References

External links

1993 births
Living people
German ice hockey left wingers
German people of Czech descent
Augsburger Panther players
Sportspeople from Freiburg im Breisgau
Kölner Haie players
EV Landshut players
Oshawa Generals players
Plymouth Whalers players
Schwenninger Wild Wings players
German expatriate ice hockey people
Expatriate ice hockey players in Canada
Expatriate ice hockey players in the United States
German expatriate sportspeople in Canada
German expatriate sportspeople in the United States